The Rouge du Roussillon is an endangered breed of sheep from southern France. It is primarily raised in the French Mediterranean countryside for lamb meat.

Characteristics
The Rouge du Rossillon is of Algerian descent, and came to France in the 18th century, and was likely introduced to France via Spain.

The Rouge du Rossillon is a medium fine-wool breed. The males typically weigh 75–100 kg and stand 75–90 cm tall, while ewes normally weigh around 55–65 kg and stand 65–75 cm tall. In terms of coloration, the Rouge du Rossillon typically has white wool with red colored head and legs. The sheep are extremely hardy, and are able to survive all year outside. They can also thrive at high temperatures, and can live in climates with temperatures of over 40 degrees Celsius. However, they also do well in colder climates with scarce food supplies.

Uses
The main use of the Rouge du Rossillon is meat. Traditionally, lamb meat has accounted for about 95% of income from raising Rouge du Rossillons. The lambs are usually sold when they are still fairly light, around 28–30 kg. Lambs sold when they are heavier are commonly considered to be too fatty and are not as desirable on the market. The rest of the income comes from wool sales They were historically milked, with the milk often being used for cheese production, but this is not common today.

Rouge du Rossillon are not raised by transhumance, with herds mostly being sedentary. from mid-October to march the herds graze on residual plants left over from crop harvests. They are often raised alongside Lacaune sheep.

Conservation status and efforts
Today, the Rouge du Roussillon is endangered, largely due to a general decline in livestock raising in its native region. There is an estimated world population remaining of around 5,900 reproductive females. However, there has been considerable improvement in recent years in terms of its population numbers. A 1974 study estimated its population at only 750 ewes and 25 rams. In 1981, national protection actions were implemented to protect the breed, and from 1994-2001 a conservation program was launched in Grand Causses regional natural park in France.

References 

Sheep breeds originating in France